Ephraim Adrale was an Anglican bishop in Uganda.

Ringtho was educated at Makerere University and ordained in 1975.  He became Bishop of Madi-West Nile in 1988 and served for two years.

References

Anglican bishops of Madi and West Nile
20th-century Anglican bishops in Uganda
Uganda Christian University alumni
Makerere University alumni